The canton of Sains-en-Gohelle is a former canton situated in the department of the Pas-de-Calais and in the Nord-Pas-de-Calais region of northern France. It was disbanded following the French canton reorganisation which came into effect in March 2015. It had a total of 20,272 inhabitants (2012).

Geography 
The canton is organised around Sains-en-Gohelle in the arrondissement of Lens. The altitude varies from 39 m (Sains-en-Gohelle) to 192 m (Bouvigny-Boyeffles) for an average altitude of 102m.

The canton comprised 6 communes:
Aix-Noulette
Bouvigny-Boyeffles
Gouy-Servins
Hersin-Coupigny
Sains-en-Gohelle
Servins

Population

See also 
Cantons of Pas-de-Calais 
Communes of Pas-de-Calais 
Arrondissements of the Pas-de-Calais department

References

Sains-en-Gohelle
2015 disestablishments in France
States and territories disestablished in 2015